Germany competed at the 2006 Winter Olympics in Turin, Italy, winning once again the most total medals of any nation. The National Olympic Committee of Germany (reorganized to German Olympic Sports Confederation (DOSB) in May 2006) nominated a total of 162 (164) athletes to compete, as the 5th largest team, in all 15 of the Winter Olympic sports.

Medalists

|align="left" valign="top"|

|align="left" valign="top"|

Alpine skiing 

Note: In the men's combined, run 1 is the downhill, and runs 2 and 3 are the slalom. In the women's combined, run 1 and 2 are the slalom, and run 3 the downhill.

Biathlon 

Men

Women

Bobsleigh

Cross-country skiing 

Sachenbacher-Stehle was suspended due to health reasons for the first five days of competition after recording too high values of haemoglobin in her blood.

Distance

Men

Women

Sprint

Curling

Men's tournament

Team: Andy Kapp (skip), Uli Kapp, Oliver Axnick, Holger Höhne, Andreas Kempf (alternate)

Round Robin

Draw 2
;Draw 3
;Draw 5
;Draw 6
;Draw 7
;Draw 9
;Draw 10
;Draw 11
;Draw 12

Standings

Figure skating 

Key: CD = Compulsory Dance, FD = Free Dance, FS = Free Skate, OD = Original Dance, SP = Short Program

Freestyle skiing

Ice hockey 

Germany's ice hockey contingent was the nation's largest at the Olympics, with 20 women and 23 men.

Men's tournament

Players

Round-robin

Women's tournament

Players

Round-robin

Classification games

5th-8th classification

5th place game

Luge

Nordic combined 

Note: 'Deficit' refers to the amount of time behind the leader a competitor began the cross-country portion of the event. Italicized numbers show the final deficit from the winner's finishing time.

Short track speed skating 

Key: 'ADV' indicates a skater was advanced due to being interfered with.

Skeleton

Ski jumping 

Note: PQ indicates a skier was pre-qualified for the final, based on entry rankings.

Snowboarding 

Halfpipe

Note: In the final, the single best score from two runs is used to determine the ranking. A bracketed score indicates a run that wasn't counted.

Parallel GS

Key: '+ Time' represents a deficit; the brackets indicate the results of each run.

Snowboard Cross

Speed skating 

Men

Women

Team Pursuit

Notes and references

Further references
  NOK-Präsidium nominiert weitere 135 Aktive für die Olympischen Winterspiele - 162 Sportlerinnen und Sportler nach Turin  from nok.de, retrieved 25 January 2006
  27 Turin Tickets vergeben - Präsidium benennt Dr. Clemens Prokop als Vertreter für Findungskommission des DOSB-Präsidiums  from nok.de, retrieved 25 January 2006

Nations at the 2006 Winter Olympics
2006
Winter Olympics